This is a list of horror films that were released in 2021.

References

External links
 Horror films of 2021 on Internet Movie Database

2021
2021-related lists